The 2008 Nordic Trophy Junior was the second Nordic Trophy Junior ice hockey tournament, played 21-24 August 2008. All games were played at the JM-hallen and Stora Mossen arenas.

Participating clubs 

The 2008 tournament featured 8 teams from Sweden and Finland.

Regulation round

Group A

Standings

Games

21 August 
 Djurgårdens IF – Tappara 3 – 2 (1–0, 2–1, 0–1)
 TPS – Färjestads BK 2 – 3 SD (1–0, 1–1, 0–1, 0–1)

22 August 
 Tappara – TPS 3 – 4 GWS (0–1, 0–2, 3–0, 0–0, 0–1)
 Färjestads BK – Djurgårdens IF 1 – 2 (0–0, 1–1, 0–1)

23 August 
 Djurgårdens IF – TPS 3 – 2 (1–1, 2–0, 0–1)
 Tappara – Färjestads BK 0 – 6 (0–0, 0–4, 0–2)

Group B

Standings

Games

21 August 
 Frölunda HC – HIFK 0 – 3 (0–1, 0–0, 0–2)
 Kärpät – Linköpings HC 6 – 2 (3–1, 2–0, 1–1)

22 August 
 HIFK – Kärpät 2 – 3 SD (1–1, 0–1, 1–0, 0–1)
 Linköpings HC – Frölunda HC 3 – 4 SD (1–0, 2–2, 0–1, 0–1)

23 August 
 HIFK – Linköpings HC 4 – 3 SD (1–1, 1–2, 1–0, 1–0)
 Frölunda HC – Kärpät 3 – 4 (0–2, 2–0, 1–2)

Playoffs

24 August 
 Final: Djurgårdens IF – Kärpät 5 – 1 (2–1, 2–0, 1–0)
 Bronze medal game: HIFK – Färjestads BK 1 – 3 (1–3, 0–0, 0–0)
 5th place game: TPS – Frölunda HC 1 – 3 (1–0, 0–3, 0–0)
 7th place game: Linköpings HC – Tappara 2 – 6 (1–1, 0–3, 1–2)

Final standings

External links 
 Stats.swehockey.se

Nordic Trophy Junior
2008
Nor
Nordic